Raymond Edward Brown  (May 22, 1928  – August 8, 1998) was an American Sulpician priest and prominent biblical scholar. He was regarded as a specialist concerning the hypothetical "Johannine community", which he speculated contributed to the authorship of the Gospel of John, and he also wrote influential studies on the birth and death of Jesus. 

Brown was professor emeritus at Union Theological Seminary (UTS) in New York where he taught for 29 years. He was the first Catholic professor to gain tenure there, where he earned a reputation as a superior lecturer.

Life
Born in New York City, the son of Robert H. and Loretta Brown, Raymond studied at the Catholic University of America where he received a bachelor's degree in 1948 and a Master of Arts degree in 1949 as a Basselin scholar. In 1953 he was ordained a Catholic priest for the Diocese of St. Augustine. In 1955, he joined the Society of Saint-Sulpice following his reception of a doctorate in Sacred Theology from St. Mary's Seminary in Baltimore. He earned a second doctorate in Semitic languages in 1958 from Johns Hopkins University, where one of his advisors was William F. Albright.

Following his studies, Brown taught at his alma mater, St. Mary's Seminary, until 1971. During this period he was invited to work as a research fellow at the American Schools of Oriental Research in Jerusalem, where he worked on a concordance of the Dead Sea Scrolls. In 1963 he served as a peritus (expert adviser) to the Bishop of St. Augustine, Joseph P. Hurley, at the Second Vatican Council.

Brown was appointed in 1972 to the Pontifical Biblical Commission and again in 1996. He was the Auburn Distinguished Professor of Biblical Studies at the Union Theological Seminary in New York City, where he taught from 1971 to 1990, when he retired with the title of professor emeritus.  He served as the President of the Catholic Biblical Association, the Society of Biblical Literature (1976–77), and the Society of New Testament Studies (1986–87). Widely regarded as one of America's preeminent biblical scholars, Brown was awarded 24 honorary doctoral degrees by universities in the United States and Europe—many from Protestant institutions.

Brown died at Saint Patrick's Seminary and University in Menlo Park, California. The Archbishop of Los Angeles, Cardinal Roger Mahony, hailed him as "the most distinguished and renowned Catholic biblical scholar to emerge in this country ever" and his death, the cardinal said, was "a great loss to the Church."

Scholarly views
Brown was one of the first Catholic scholars in the United States to use the historical-critical method to study the Bible.

In 1943, reversing the approach that had existed since Pope Leo XIII's encyclical Providentissimus Deus fifty years earlier, Pope Pius XII's encyclical Divino afflante Spiritu expressed approval of historical-critical methods. For Brown, this was a "Magna Carta for biblical progress." In 1965, at the Second Vatican Council, the Church moved further in this direction, adopting the Dogmatic Constitution on Divine Revelation Dei verbum, instead of the conservative schema "On the Sources of Revelation" that originally had been submitted. While it stated that Scripture teaches "solidly, faithfully and without error that truth which God wanted put into sacred writings for the sake of salvation," Brown points out the ambiguity of this statement, which opened the way for a new interpretation of inerrancy by shifting from a literal interpretation of the text towards a focus on "the extent to which it conforms to the salvific purpose of God." He saw this as the Church "turning the corner" on inerrancy: "the Roman Catholic Church does not change her official stance in a blunt way. Past statements are not rejected but are requoted with praise and then reinterpreted at the same time. ... What was really going on was an attempt gracefully to retain what was salvageable from the past and to move in a new direction at the same time."

New Testament Christology
In a detailed 1965 article in the journal Theological Studies examining whether Jesus was ever called "God" in the New Testament, Brown concluded that "Even the fourth Gospel never portrays Jesus as saying specifically that he is God" and "there is no reason to think that Jesus was called God in the earliest layers of New Testament tradition." He argued that "Gradually, in the development of Christian thought God was understood to be a broader term. It was seen that God had revealed so much of Himself in Jesus that God had to be able to include both Father and Son."

Thirty years later, Brown revisited the issue in an introductory text for the general public, writing that in "three reasonably clear instances in the NT (Hebrews 1:8–9, John 1:1, 20:28) and in five instances that have probability, Jesus is called God," a usage Brown regarded as a natural development of early references to Jesus as "Lord".

Gospel of John
Brown analyzed the Gospel of John and divided it into two sections, which he labelled the "Book of Signs" and the "Book of Glory." The Book of Signs recounts Jesus' public miracles, which are called signs. The Book of Glory comprises Jesus' private teaching to his disciples, his crucifixion, and his resurrection.

Brown identified three layers of text in John: 1) an initial version Brown considers based on personal experience of Jesus; 2) a structured literary creation by the evangelist which draws upon additional sources; and 3) the edited version that readers know today.

Reactions

Support
Brown has been described as “the premier Johannine scholar in the English-speaking world.” Terrence T. Prendergast stated that “for nearly 40 years Father Brown caught the entire church up into the excitement and new possibilities of scriptural scholarship."  Much of Brown's work was given a nihil obstat and an imprimatur (the nihil obstat is a statement by an official reviewer, appointed by a bishop, that "nothing stands in the way" of a book being given an imprimatur; the imprimatur, which must normally be issued by a bishop of the diocese of publication, is the official endorsement – "let it be printed" – that a book contains nothing damaging to Catholic faith and morals).  Brown was the expert appointed to review and provide the nihil obstat for The Jerome Biblical Commentary and The New Jerome Biblical Commentary, the standard basic reference book for Catholic Biblical studies, of which he was one of the editors and to which he himself contributed, as did dozens of other Catholic scholars.

Joseph Ratzinger, later Pope Benedict XVI, was personally complimentary of Brown and his scholarship, and said that he "would be very happy if we had many exegetes like Father Brown".

Criticism
Brown's immense body of work was, at times, controversial among some traditionalists who objected to the elements of his work that they regarded as casting doubt on the historical accuracy of numerous articles of the Catholic faith. His critics included Cardinal Lawrence Shehan and Father Richard W. Gilsdorf, the latter of whom postulated that Brown's work was "a major contribution to the befogged wasteland of an 'American Church' progressively alienated from its divinely constituted center."

Other writers, critical of historical Christian claims about Jesus, criticized Brown for excessive caution, for what they saw as his unwillingness to acknowledge the radical implications of the critical methods he was using. Literary critic Frank Kermode, in his review of The Birth of the Messiah, accused Brown of being too eager to secure the imprimatur of the Catholic Church. The Hebraic Jesus scholar Géza Vermes speaking of the Nativity narratives has described Brown's coverage as "the primary example of the position of having your cake and eating it." In The New York Times obituary, Gustav Niebuhr wrote: "Father Brown was regarded as a centrist, with a reputation as a man of the church and a rigorous, exacting scholar whose work had to be reckoned with."

Aspects of Brown's multi-lingual, internationally peer-reviewed scholarship remains controversial among Anglophone traditionalist Catholics because of their claim that he denied the inerrancy of the whole of scripture and cast doubt on the historical accuracy of numerous articles of the Catholic faith. Some traditionalists criticized his questioning of whether the virginal conception of Jesus could be proven historically. He was regarded as occupying the center ground in the field of biblical studies, opposing the literalism found among many fundamentalist Christians while not carrying his conclusions as far as many other scholars.

Works

Thesis
  – This was his dissertation in partial fulfillment of his doctorate in Sacred Theology. Brown did much to define the term sensus plenior and had an enormous influence on the twentieth-century debate concerning the term.

Books
His total of 25 books on biblical subjects include:
 
 
 
 
 
 
 
 
 
  – with a reappraisal of the infancy gospels.

Editor

See also
John Shelby Spong#Criticism
Catholic modernism

References

External links 
Biblical Theology Bulletin obituary notice
A Wayward Turn in Biblical Theory Msgr. George A. Kelly, (1999). Critical article from the traditionalist point of view.
Felix Corley, "Obituary: The Rev Raymond E. Brown", The Independent, London, 19 August 1998
Quotables from R.E. Brown, S.S.

1928 births
1998 deaths
Clergy from New York City
St. Mary's Seminary and University alumni
Sulpicians
Catholic University of America alumni
Johns Hopkins University alumni
20th-century American Roman Catholic priests
St. Mary's Seminary and University faculty
Dead Sea Scrolls
Participants in the Second Vatican Council
Christologists
American biblical scholars
New Testament scholars
Roman Catholic biblical scholars
Contributors to the Anchor Bible Series
Pontifical Biblical Commission
Union Theological Seminary (New York City) faculty
Burials in California
Bible commentators